Aghcheh Rish may refer to:
 Aghcheh Rish, Charuymaq
 Aghcheh Rish, Hashtrud